Itai Hagman (born 13 February 1983) is an Argentine economist and politician who has been a National Deputy elected in the City of Buenos Aires since 2019. A member of the Patria Grande Front, Hagman was elected in the Frente de Todos list in 2019.

Early life and education
Hagman was born on 13 February 1983 in Jerusalem. In his youth, he played football in the lower divisions of All Boys. He studied Economic Sciences at the University of Buenos Aires, graduating in 2013. In addition, he counts with a post-graduate degree on Popular Education from Universidad Popular de las Madres de Plaza de Mayo.

Political career
In March 2010, Hagman was elected co-president of the Federación Universitaria de Buenos Aires (FUBA), Argentina's largest student federation. In 2013, Hagman became part of Marea Popular, a political group formed with the aim of competing in the 2013 legislative election in Buenos Aires. Alongside Popular Unity, Marea Popular formed part of the Camino Popular front; the list, which attained 2.17% of the vote in the P.A.S.O. primaries in August 2013, had Hagman as the first candidate to the Chmber of Deputies.

In 2016, Hagman launched, alongside others, the AHORA Buenos Aires platform. The platform was part of Unidad Ciudadana in Buenos Aires (where it was known as Unidad Porteña), and participated in the 2017 P.A.S.O. primaries against the lists headed by Daniel Filmus and Guillermo Moreno. The AHORA Buenos Aires list landed last in the primaries, and did not get to participate in the general election.

In 2018, he formed part of the foundation of the Patria Grande Front, alongside social leader Juan Grabois and other left-wing activists and politicians. Hagman was first elected to the Chamber of Deputies in 2019 in the Frente de Todos list in Buenos Aires, in which he was the third candidate.

Electoral history

References

External links
Profile on the official website of the Chamber of Deputies (in Spanish)

1983 births
Living people
Argentine economists
Politicians from Jerusalem
Politicians from Buenos Aires
Israeli expatriates in Argentina
Jewish Argentine politicians
Members of the Argentine Chamber of Deputies elected in Buenos Aires
University of Buenos Aires alumni